Columbus is a city in Columbia (mostly) and Dodge Counties in the south-central part of the U.S. state of Wisconsin. The population was 5,540 at the 2020 census. All of this population resided in the Columbia County portion of the city. The Columbia County portion of the city lies within the Madison Metropolitan Statistical Area while the Dodge County portion is a part of the Milwaukee-Waukesha-Racine CSA. Nearly all of the city is located within the town of Columbus in Columbia County, though a small portion lies within the town of Elba in Dodge County.

History

H. A. Whitney, a Yankee peddler from Vermont, moved to Columbus in 1845 and constructed the first wood frame store building in the community on the land where the Whitney now stands. The building served as a combination store/tavern/rooming house and post office, with Whitney as the first postmaster. In 1857, the building burned down and was replaced by the current Whitney Hotel in 1858. This cream brick, Italianate-style hotel's third floor ballroom was heated by six wood-burning stoves. The local newspaper reported on a ball there in 1863, "if you ever hear of a ball by Fuller, ask no questions, but go at once, and enjoy yourselves, and for one night forget the 'fear of the draft'".

During the 1880s, The Whitney hosted traveling health practitioners whose expertise ranged from "delivering a 40-foot long tape worm" to a local couple to curing piles. Near the turn of the 20th century, the ballroom was turned into an apartment, and from then on served as commercial, professional, and apartment space.

In the 1950s, a restaurant and bar occupied the first floor of the building. From the 1960s to the present, a succession of owners occupied the building and maintenance was deferred. In the 1950s, the building fell into disrepair and as a result of its continued decline, faced demolition in 1990. In February 1991, Heartland Properties, Inc. helped local citizens create the Columbus Downtown Development Corporation (CDDC), which served as the developer to restore the Whitney. 
 
Today, the Whitney provides affordable housing for eight households and 1,570 square feet of downtown retail space for local businesses, including the Daily Citizen newspaper.

Geography
Columbus is located at  (43.337366, -89.022753).

Climate

Demographics

In 1900, 2,349 people lived in Columbus, Wisconsin; in 1910, there were 2,523 residents.

2020 census 
As of the 2020 census, 5,540 people were living in Columbus, Wisconsin. Ethnically, the population was 5.2% Hispanic or Latino of any race. When grouping both Hispanic and non-Hispanic people together by race, the city was 90.5% White, 1.5% Black or African American, 0.8% Asian, 0.1% Native American, 0.1% Pacific Islander, 1.7% from other races, and 5.4% from two or more races.

According  to the American Community Survey estimates for 2016-2020, the median income for a household in the city was $65,029, and the median income for a family was $81,413. Male full-time workers had a median income of $54,328 versus $42,118 for female workers. The per capita income for the city was $33,946. About 3.3% of families and 3.9% of the population were below the poverty line, including 2.9% of those under age 18 and 4.4% of those age 65 or over. Of the population age 25 and over, 94.4% were high school graduates or higher and 36.1% had a bachelor's degree or higher.

2010 census
As of the census of 2010, there were 4,991 people, 2,123 households, and 1,336 families living in the city. The racial makeup of the city was 95.7% White, 0.9% African American, 0.3% Native American, 0.6% Asian, 1.1% from other races, and 1.4% from two or more races. Hispanic or Latino of any race were 3.3% of the population.

There were 2,123 households, of which 31.3% had children under the age of 18 living with them, 48.5% were married couples living together, 9.8% had a female householder with no husband present, 4.6% had a male householder with no wife present, and 37.1% were non-families. 30.8% of all households were made up of individuals, and 11.2% had someone living alone who was 65 years of age or older. The average household size was 2.33 and the average family size was 2.91.

The median age in the city was 38.3 years. 24.1% of residents were under the age of 18; 7.1% were between the ages of 18 and 24; 27.7% were from 25 to 44; 27.2% were from 45 to 64; and 14.1% were 65 years of age or older. The gender makeup of the city was 48.8% male and 51.2% female.

2000 census
As of the census of 2000, there were 4,479 people, 1,843 households, and 1,194 families living in the city. The population density was 1,122.7 people per square mile (433.4/km2). There were 1,927 housing units at an average density of 483.0 per square mile (186.5/km2). The racial makeup of the city was 98.28% White, 0.36% Black or African American, 0.22% Native American, 0.31% Asian, 0.02% Pacific Islander, 0.29% from other races, and 0.51% from two or more races. Hispanic or Latino of any race were 0.98% of the population.

There were 1,843 households, out of which 32.0% had children under the age of 18 living with them, 52.0% were married couples living together, 9.0% had a female householder with no husband present, and 35.2% were non-families. 31.4% of all households were made up of individuals, and 14.1% had someone living alone who was 65 years of age or older. The average household size was 2.37 and the average family size was 2.98.

In the city, the population was spread out, with 26.0% under the age of 18, 6.6% from 18 to 24, 29.9% from 25 to 44, 20.2% from 45 to 64, and 17.3% who were 65 years of age or older. The median age was 38 years. For every 100 females, there were 91.0 males. For every 100 females age 18 and over, there were 87.1 males.

The median income for a household in the city was $42,667, and the median income for a family was $52,604. Males had a median income of $36,518 versus $22,891 for females. The per capita income for the city was $21,435. About 3.7% of families and 5.4% of the population were below the poverty line, including 4.0% of those under age 18 and 11.7% of those age 65 or over.

Education

Columbus is served by the Columbus School District, which operates an elementary school, a middle school, and a high school:
Columbus Elementary School (K-2)
Columbus Intermediate School (3-5)
Columbus Middle School (6-8)
Columbus High School (9-12)

Other schools in Columbus:	
 St. Jerome Catholic School, Roman Catholic, grades K-8
 Zion Lutheran School, WELS (Wisconsin Evangelical Lutheran Synod), grades K-8
 Wisconsin Academy, Seventh Day Adventist, grades 9-12

Transportation
Columbus is served by Amtrak's Empire Builder between Chicago and Seattle, with a train stopping at the station in each direction every day. Freight railroad services are provided by the Soo Line Railroad, a legal U.S. alias of the Canadian Pacific Railway. Columbus has the distinction of hosting the primary Amtrak station for the Madison metro area.

Columbus is also served by Lamers Bus Service which provides a Connect to Madison, Wisconsin from Amtrak.

List of intercity bus stops in Wisconsin

Highways 
Columbus is served by US 151. Columbus is almost halfway on the US 151 freeway/expressway between Madison and Fond du Lac. There are 3 exits on the freeway that serve Columbus. The exits are Wis 73/Business US 151 Park Ave (Exit 115), Wis 16/Wis 60 James St (Exit 118) and Wis 73/Business US 151 Ludington St (Exit 120).
Columbus is also served by 4 state highways.
 Wis 16 runs northwest towards Portage and east with Wis 60 for several miles before heading to Watertown.
 Wis 60 heads west to Lodi and east to Hustiford.
 Wis 73 runs south to Marshall and north to Randolph.
 Wis 89 heads south to Waterloo and Fort Atkinson.
 Business US 151 is cosigned with Wis 73 through Columbus.

Historic buildings

 Adolphus and Sarah Ingalsbe House
 Albert M. and Alice Bellack House
 Columbus City Hall
 Columbus Post Office
 Columbus Fireman's Park Complex
 Columbus Public Library
 E. Clarke and Julia Arnold House
 F. A. Chadbourn House
 Farmers and Merchants Union Bank
 Frances Kurth Sharrow House
 Fred and Lucia Farnham House
 George Griswold House
 Gov. James T. Lewis House
 Holsten Family Farmstead
 John A. and Maggie Jones House
 Kurth Brewery
 Reinhard and Amelia Schendel House
 Whitney Hotel Building
 Zion Evangelical Lutheran Church and Parsonage
 Amtrak station (1906)
 Chapel Street Water Tower

Attractions
 Christopher Columbus Museum
 Farmers and Merchants Union Bank, a "jewel box" bank building designed by architect Louis Sullivan

Events

The Redbud Festival is held in May around Mother's Day. Each year, the community crowns a prince and princess during the budding of the "Columbus Wisconsin Strain" of the redbud tree (cercis canadensis). The festival includes brats, music, and trees in full bloom.

Movie set
Downtown Columbus was used to film several scenes for the 2009 Johnny Depp movie Public Enemies. The Farmers & Merchants Union Bank is featured in the film.

Notable people

 Michael Adams, Wisconsin state representative and businessman
 Charles L. Dering, Wisconsin State Senator
 Francis Fagan, Navy Cross recipient
 Harmon J. Fisk, Wisconsin state representative
 William M. Griswold, Wisconsin state senator
 Joshua James Guppey, Union Army general
 William Jones, Wisconsin state representative
 Frank Lange, major league baseball player
 James T. Lewis, governor of Wisconsin
 Lewis Ludington, founded the city
 Heather Miller, Olympic athlete
 Peter Morris, major league baseball player
 Bob Poser, major league baseball player
 Frederick J. Stare, nutritionist
 Samuel R. Webster, Wisconsin state representative
 Russel R. Weisensel, Wisconsin state representative
 E. W. Ziebarth, radio broadcaster

Gallery

References

Further reading
 Stare, Fred A. (ed.). Story of Columbus.
 "The City of Columbus" in The History of Columbia County, Wisconsin. Chicago: Western Historical Company, 1880.

External links

 City of Columbus
 Columbus Wisconsin Chamber of Commerce
 Sanborn fire insurance maps: 1885 1892 1898 1904 1915

 
Cities in Wisconsin
Cities in Columbia County, Wisconsin
Cities in Dodge County, Wisconsin